The  is a river in Japan which flows through Gifu Prefecture. It empties into the Ijira River.

Geography
The upper part of the river between Yamagata and where the river merges with the Ijira River is prone to flooding. Flooding was particularly bad after Super Typhoon Fran in 1976. Over 10,000 buildings suffered some damage from the flood, which caused more than 38 billion yen in damage.

River communities
The river passes through the cities of Yamagata and Gifu.

References

Rivers of Gifu Prefecture
Rivers of Japan